Agra is a Latvian feminine given name. The associated name day is 8 November.

Agra was the only given name of 321 persons in Latvia on October 22, 2015.

Notable people named Agra 
 Agra Klestrova, Latvian photographer

References 

Latvian feminine given names
Feminine given names